
Laguna Cáceres is a lake in Germán Busch Province, Santa Cruz Department, Bolivia. At an elevation of 150 m, its surface area is 26.5 to 200 km².

Lakes of Santa Cruz Department (Bolivia)